Victoria Sellers (born 20 January 1965) is a British-American model, actress, comedian, and jewellery designer.

Early life
Born in London, Sellers attended Lycée Français de Los Angeles in West Los Angeles, University High School in West Los Angeles and Crossroads School for Arts and Sciences in the class of 1981.
She became friends with the "Hollywood Madam" Heidi Fleiss in their teens.

She is the only child from the marriage of actor Peter Sellers and actress Britt Ekland.

A letter auctioned in 2010, one of the last documents signed by her father before his death, indicates that he was trying to increase the amount of money to be inherited by her from £800 to £20,000 (£ as of ).

Career
Sellers posed for Playboy in April 1986. In the same year she was indicted for her role in a cocaine-trafficking gang, and was placed on probation for three years.

She performed as a stand-up comic in the early 1990s. With Heidi Fleiss, she hosted and produced an instructional DVD titled Sex Tips with Heidi Fleiss and Victoria Sellers in 2001.

In 2005, Sellers began designing jewellery. At one time she was filming the reality show The Eklands for Swedish television with her mother and half-brothers, Nick and T.J.

In 2009, she was the subject of episode 4 of the British reality series Rehab. In 2013–14 she appeared on Swedish television along with her mother in Svenska Hollywoodfruar.

References

External links
 

1965 births
Living people
Actresses from London
English film actresses
English people of Portuguese-Jewish descent
English people of Swedish descent
20th-century English actresses
Crossroads School alumni
Victoria
British jewellery designers
University High School (Los Angeles) alumni
Women jewellers